The New Zealand Messenger Championship is a Group One event for standardbred pacing horses in New Zealand, run at Alexandra Park.

Race scheduling

In recent years the race has been held in late April or early May. 

It was previously raced on the same race-night as the Rowe Cup and Northern Trotting Derby for trotters and the New Zealand Sires Stakes Championship.

The New Zealand Messenger Championship had traditionally been restricted to 4 year-old horses and was the most prestigious race for that age group in New Zealand, and a key guide to feature races in the following season like the New Zealand Trotting Cup and Auckland Cup.  This is evidenced by New Zealand Messenger Championship winners and subsequent Cup victors such as:
 Lazarus
 Auckland Reactor
 Monkey King
 Mainland Banner
 Elsu 
 Just An Excuse.

For the 2013, 2014 and 2015 years 5 year olds were also eligible to compete in the race. However, from 2016 it reverted to 4 year olds only. However, in 2022 the New Zealand Messenger and it’s traditional lead up race, the Noel J Taylor Mile, were both opened up to older horses

Winners list

Other major races

 Auckland Trotting Cup
 New Zealand Trotting Cup
 Great Northern Derby
 Rowe Cup
 Dominion Handicap
 Noel J Taylor Mile
 Inter Dominion Pacing Championship
 Inter Dominion Trotting Championship
 Miracle Mile Pace

See also 

 Harness racing in New Zealand
 Harness racing

References 

Harness racing in New Zealand
Horse races in New Zealand